Stella Niagara is a hamlet in Niagara County, New York, United States. Stella Niagara had a post office until July 19, 1997; it still has its own ZIP code, 14144.

References

Hamlets in Niagara County, New York
Hamlets in New York (state)